Mankulam  is a village in Idukki district in the Indian state of Kerala. This is the first Grama Panchayat in Kerala which produces electricity on its own. It sells it to the Electricity board of Kerala.

Demographics
 India census, Mankulam had a population of 9607, with 4920 males and 4687 females.

See also
Aanakkulam

References

Villages in Idukki district